Diamond Peak is the highest point in the Lemhi Range in the Rocky Mountains in Idaho. It is the highest point in the Caribou-Targhee National Forest.


See also

List of mountain peaks of North America
List of mountain peaks of the United States
List of Ultras of the United States

References

External links

Mountains of Idaho
Mountains of Butte County, Idaho